Talsarnau railway station serves the village of Talsarnau on the estuary of the Afon Dwyryd in Gwynedd, Wales.

Facilities

In early 2015, Talsarnau was one of several stations on the Cambrian Coast Line to get a Harrington Hump (rather than raising the whole platform, a raised area is built where the middle doors of the train are when it stops at Talsarnau) made of paving slabs, cement and tarmac. This means that for those getting off or on the train through the middle doors of the train, the vertical step is very much reduced.

Services
The station is an unstaffed halt on the Cambrian Coast Railway with passenger services to Porthmadog, Pwllheli, Barmouth, Machynlleth and Shrewsbury. All trains call only on request. The station building is now a private residence.

Sources

References

External links

 RAILSCOT on Aberystwith and Welsh Coast Railway

Railway stations in Gwynedd
DfT Category F2 stations
Former Cambrian Railway stations
Railway stations in Great Britain opened in 1867
Railway stations served by Transport for Wales Rail
Railway request stops in Great Britain
1867 establishments in Wales
Talsarnau